The Vineyard is a street in Richmond, in the London Borough of Richmond upon Thames. It includes three groups of almshouses,  a Grade II listed church (St Elizabeth of Portugal Church) and Clarence House, a 17th-century Grade II listed house associated with Bernardo O’Higgins, who is commemorated on the wall of the property with a blue plaque, installed by English Heritage, for his role in the Chilean War of Independence.

Notes

References

Further reading
 Richmond Local History Society (2019). The Streets of Richmond and Kew (3rd edition),  .

External links
 

 
Richmond, London